Nineteen Ninety-Four is a BBC Radio 4 comedy series and a book written by William Osborne and Richard Turner.  The six-part radio series was first broadcast in March 1985, and the book  published in 1986. The title is a reference to the dystopian novel Nineteen Eighty-Four by George Orwell.

BBC Radio 4 Extra rebroadcast Nineteen Ninety-Four between 17 August and 21 September 2011.

Cast

 Robert Lindsay as Edward Wilson
 Paul Shearer as Charles
 Siobhan Redmond as Sophie
 Stephen Fry
 Hugh Laurie
 Emma Thompson
 David Goodland
 Pam Ferris
 Richard Turner
 Mark Knox

Episodes

Nineteen Ninety-Eight
A sequel series of six episodes entitled Nineteen Ninety-Eight broadcast in 1987 continued the plot line. It was published as a book  in 1988 and rebroadcast on BBC Radio 4 Extra from 8 February to 14 March 2012.

Cast

 David Threlfall as Edward Wilson
 Mike Myers
 Stephen Fry
 Hugh Laurie
 Pam Ferris
 Jenny Luckraft
 Steve Steen
 Rebecca Stevens
 Richard Turner

Episodes

References

External links
 Every Other Thing: Nineteen Ninety-Four (An Orwellian sitcom)
 
  
 

 

BBC Radio comedy programmes
BBC Radio 4 programmes
1985 radio programme debuts
Comedy books
British science fiction radio programmes
Dystopian fiction